Jennifers' Law or Jennifer's Law may refer to:

 Jennifers' Law (Connecticut), passed in 2021, to expand the definition of "domestic violence"
 Jennifer's Law (Texas), passed in 2007, to permit school districts to award posthumous diplomas to high school students